Jewell may refer to:

Places in the United States
Jewell, California
Jewell, Georgia
Jewell, Kansas
Jewell, New York
Jewell, Oregon
Jewell County, Kansas
Jewell Junction, Iowa

Places in Greenland
Jewell Fjord

People with the given name Jewell 

 Jewell (singer)
 Jewell James

Other uses
 Jewell (surname)
Jewell (automobile), an American car produced 1906–1909
Jewell railway station, Victoria, Australia
William Jewell College, Liberty, Missouri, United States
Jewell Building, a building in North Omaha, Nebraska, United States

See also
 Jewel (disambiguation)
 Jewellery
 Jewells (disambiguation)
 Jewels (disambiguation)